Karthik Sarma (born 1974/1975) is an Indian-American billionaire hedge fund manager. As of September 2022, his net worth was estimated at US$3.1 billion. 

Sarma earned a bachelor's degree from the Indian Institute of Technology Madras, and a master's degree from Princeton University.

Sarma worked as a consultant at McKinsey & Co for three years before joining Tiger Global Management, where he worked for five years. In 2006, he founded the hedge fund SRS Investment Management in 2006 and now manages $10 billion. SRS owns 43% of Avis Budget Group and Sarma is a director.

In 2021, Sarma was one of eight hedge fund managers to earn over $1 billion, with $2 billion, mostly from a 5.5 times rise in the Avis share price.

He lives in New York City.

References

Living people
Indian billionaires
American billionaires
Indian company founders
Princeton University alumni
IIT Bombay alumni
1970s births